Stephen Michael Stahl is an author and professor of psychiatry with expertise in psychopharmacology. He is currently a professor at the University of California, San Diego and serves as Honorary Fellow in psychiatry department at the University of Cambridge. He is also the chairman of Neuroscience Education Institute (NEI) and Arbor Scientia Group.

Stahl also serves as the Director of Psychopharmacology Services at the California Department of State Hospitals as well as the Editor-in Chief of CNS Spectrums.

He is an internationally recognized authority in psychiatry having published over 500 scientific papers, edited 12 textbooks and personally written 35 text books including the two best-selling textbooks in the field of psychiatry and psychopharmacology over the past twenty years. He has contributed significantly to the field of psychopharmacology through his research in the 70s, 80s and 90s, especially in the area of serotonin, schizophrenia and depression. In addition to his many academic contributions, Stahl is known for his  2015 novel Shell Shock and his expert contribution to exposing inadequate mental health care for returning soldiers from Iraq and Afghanistan.

In 2002, The International College of Neuropsychopharmacology honoured Stahl with the Lundbeck Foundation Award in Education for contributions to postgraduate education in psychiatry and neurology.

Education and early career 
Stahl was born in Wauseon, Ohio and raised in Bryan, Ohio. In 1973, he completed his B.S. degree from Northwestern University and received his M.D. there in 1975. In 1976, he received his Ph.D. in Neuropharmacology from the University of Chicago. Later he trained in internal medicine at the University of Chicago, in neurology at the University of California, San Francisco and in psychiatry at Stanford University. He is board certified in psychiatry. In 1981, he completed his residency in psychiatry at Stanford and became the assistant director of the Stanford Mental Health Clinical Research Center and assistant professor of psychiatry and behavioral Sciences at Stanford University Medical School where he worked until 1985.

Career

Academic career 
Stahl joined Stanford University in 1981 as an assistant professor of Psychiatry and Behavioural Sciences and taught there till 1985 when he became an adjunct associate professor of psychiatry and behavioural sciences and pharmacology at the University of California Los Angeles while working and living overseas in the UK where he taught at the Institute of Psychiatry, London as a Senior Lecturer and at the Institute of Neurology and the National Hospital for Nervous Diseases, London also as a Senior Lecturer. He served as an honorary consultant in psychiatry at the Maudsley Hospital, London from 1985 – 1988. In 1988, he joined University of California, San Diego as professor of psychiatry and chief of psychiatry at the San Diego Veterans Affairs Hospital. Currently he is an adjunct professor at the University of California San Diego.

In 2009, he was selected as an honorary senior visiting fellow by the University of Cambridge. He also directs psychopharmacology services and academic programs for the California Department of State Hospital System, where he also heads their assessment and treatment efforts to reduce violence.

Career in hospitals and pharmaceutical industry 
In 1981, he became the director of Movement Disorders & Psychopharmacology Research Clinic at Veterans Affairs Medical Center in Palo Alto and chief of the Schizophrenia Biological Research Center and served there till 1985. Simultaneously, he also worked with the Alza Corporation as director of clinical sciences, associate medical director and principal scientist from 1982 to 1985 and then joined the Merck & Co. Research Laboratories and moved overseas to their Neuroscience Research Centre outside of London in 1985, where he stayed till 1988 as the director of the Laboratory of Clinical Neuropharmacology, head of a normal volunteer research unit, and executive director of research in Parkinson’s Disease ultimately leading to the registration of Sinemet CR for this condition.

He has also been a scientific consultant and member of scientific advisory boards for dozens of Pharmaceutical companies, medical information companies, and public service organizations including the state Medicaid drug utilization committee of California over the past 35 years. He also serves as a member of the scientific advisory board for the psychiatric genomics company Genomind.

Works
Stahl is author of over 500 articles and book chapters and more than 1600 scientific presentations and abstracts. He has written 35 text books and edited 12 others, including the best-selling and award-winning Stahl’s Essential Psychopharmacology, now in its fifth edition and Essential Psychopharmacology Prescriber’s Guide, now in its seventh edition. In 2015, he published the thriller novel Shell Shock.

Stahl’s interests are dedicated to producing and disseminating educational information about diseases and their treatments in psychiatry and neurology, with a special emphasis on multimedia, the internet.

Stahl had a major input related to revelations about inadequate mental health care in the US Army and at Fort Hood His role was to train caregivers of wounded soldiers and ensure that the current system was appropriate.

Partial bibliography 
Essential Psychopharmacology. Cambridge University Press, New York, 1996. 2000. 2008. 2013. 2021.
Psychopharmacology of Antidepressants.  Martin Dunitz Press, London and Mosby, New York, 1997. 
Psychopharmacology of Antipsychotics. Martin Dunitz Press, London, 1999.
Essential Psychopharmacology of Depression and Bipolar Disorder. Cambridge University Press, New York, New York, 2000.
Illustrated Insights – Sleep:  Excessive Sleepiness. NEI Press, Carlsbad, CA  2005.
Essential Psychopharmacology:  The Prescribers Guide Cambridge University Press, New York, New York, 2005. 2006. 2009. 2011. 2014. 2017. 2021.
Stahl’s Illustrated:  Chronic Pain and Fibromyalgia. Cambridge University Press, New York, New York  2009. 
Stahl's Self Assessment Examination in Psychiatry:  Multiple Choice Questions for Clinicians.  Cambridge University Press, 2012. 2016.  
 Shell Shock: A Gus Conrad Thriller, Harley House Press, 2015.

Awards and distinctions

Legacy 
In 2015, Northwestern University, his alma mater, honored him by naming their annual award for the best medical student going into psychiatry the Stephen Stahl award.

References

Living people
1951 births
People from Carlsbad, California
University of Chicago alumni
Northwestern University alumni
American psychiatrists
American male writers
People from Wauseon, Ohio